Knucklehead may refer to:
 Harley-Davidson Knucklehead engine, introduced in 1936 as Model E, Harley-Davidson's first OHV engine
 Knucklehead (2015 film), a film directed by Ben Bowman
 Knucklehead (2010 film), a film produced by WWE Studios
 Knucklehead (band), a Canadian punk rock group formed in Calgary, Canada in 1994
 Knucklehead, B-side on the 1967 single "Soul Finger" by The Bar-Kays
 Knucklehead, song by Grover Washington Jr., from the 1975 album Feels So Good
 Knuckleheads, 2012 Canadian animated series
 Knuckleheads Saloon, Kansas City, Missouri (where Karla Bonoff, Leon Redbone, and others have appeared)
 Knuckle Heads, 1992 arcade game by Namco
 Knuckleheads, 2008 platform game by Nitrome Limited
 Knuckleheads Indoor Amusement Park, at Wisconsin Dells Parkway, Lake Delton, Wisconsin
 Knucklehedz, member of hip hop collective Hit Squad

Characters
 Knucklehead, the Mascot of the band Five Finger Death Punch
 Knucklehead Smiff, ventriloquist dummy of Paul Winchell
 Knucklehead, from The Pee-wee Herman Show stage show and the Pee-wee's Playhouse television series
 Knucklehead, from the anime Battle Angel Alita
 The Knuckleheads, nickname of The Three Stooges